Haywood Lee Highsmith Jr. (born December 9, 1996) is an American professional basketball player for the Miami Heat of the National Basketball Association (NBA). Highsmith was born in Baltimore. He played college basketball for Wheeling Jesuit University and was the NCAA Division II Player of the Year as a senior in 2018.

After not being selected in the 2018 NBA draft, Highsmith began his professional basketball career with the Delaware Blue Coats of the NBA G League in 2018. Late in the 2018–19 season, Highsmith made his NBA debut with the Blue Coats' parent team Philadelphia 76ers. In later years, Highsmith played in multiple stints with the Blue Coats, the Crailsheim Merlins of the German Basketball Bundesliga, and the Miami Heat of the NBA.

Early life and college career
Originally from Baltimore, Highsmith graduated from Archbishop Curley High School in Baltimore in 2014. His high school coach Brian Hubbard told The Baltimore Sun that Highsmith had little interest from NCAA Division I colleges.

After high school, Highsmith attended Wheeling Jesuit University (now Wheeling University) and played four seasons for the Wheeling Jesuit Cardinals from 2014 to 2018. He became a starter for the team towards the end of his freshman season. He averaged 14.5 points and 9.4 rebounds as a sophomore, his full year as a starter, and was named first team All-Mountain East Conference (MEC). In his junior season, Highsmith averaged 15.3 points and 10.8 rebounds and was named second team All-MEC. As a senior, High smith averaged 22 points and 12.6 rebounds per game and was named first team All-MEC, MEC Player of the Year, and the MVP of the MEC Conference tournament. Nationally, he was named first team Division II All-America by the National Association of Basketball Coaches and the National Player of the Year by the Division II Conference Commissioner’s Association.

Professional career

Delaware Blue Coats (2018–2019) 
After going undrafted in the 2018 NBA draft, Highsmith signed with the Delaware Blue Coats of the NBA G League through a local tryout. He averaged 13.7 points per game in 21 appearances.

Philadelphia 76ers (2019) 
Highsmith was signed to a two-way contract by the Philadelphia 76ers on January 8, 2019. Under the terms of the deal, he split time between the 76ers and the Blue Coats. Highsmith made his NBA debut the same day, scoring three points in five minutes of play in a 132–115 win over the Washington Wizards, after also playing in a game for the Blue Coats against Raptors 905 earlier in the day. Highsmith finished his first professional season averaging 1.8 points and one rebound over five NBA games and 12.2 points, 6.8 rebounds , 2.5 assists, and 1.2 steals over 46 G League games (42 starts).

On June 24, 2019, the 76ers waived Highsmith.

Return to the Blue Coats (2019–2020) 
After his Exhibit 10 deal with the Phoenix Suns fell through, Highsmith returned to the 76ers to sign an Exhibit 10 contract.

Highsmith re-joined the Blue Coats for the 2019–20 season. On December 31, Highsmith posted 20 points, eight rebounds, one assist and one steal in a loss to the Maine Red Claws. He averaged 10.8 points and 6.9 rebounds per game.

Crailsheim Merlins (2020–2021) 
On September 4, 2020, Highsmith signed with the Crailsheim Merlins of the Basketball Bundesliga.

Third stint with the Blue Coats (2021) 
On July 27, 2021, Highsmith signed with Vanoli Cremona of the Italian Lega Basket Serie A (LBA) with an NBA exit option. As an Exhibit 10 offer arrived from the Philadelphia 76ers, he decided to withdraw from Cremona and return to the U.S. On September 30, he signed and was waived by the 76ers.

Highsmith rejoined the Blue Coats in 2021. He averaged 14.0 points, 5.0 rebounds, and 1.9 assists per game.

Miami Heat (2021–2022) 
On December 30, 2021, Highsmith signed a 10-day contract with the Miami Heat via the hardship exemption.

Fourth stint with the Blue Coats (2022) 
On January 9, 2022, Highsmith was reacquired by the Delaware Blue Coats.

Return to the Heat (2022–present) 
On February 15, 2022, Highsmith signed a standard 10-day contract with the Miami Heat. Ten days later, he signed a second 10-day contract. Following the expiration of the second 10-day contract, Highsmith signed a standard contract to remain with the Heat.

Career statistics

NBA

Regular season

|-
| style="text-align:left;"| 
| style="text-align:left;"| Philadelphia
| 5 || 0 || 8.0 || .400 || .200 || .000 || 1.0 || .4 || .2 || .0 || 1.8
|-
| style="text-align:left;"| 
| style="text-align:left;"| Miami
| 19 || 1 || 8.6 || .348 || .321 || .400 || 1.4 || .3 || .1 || .2 || 2.3
|- class="sortbottom"
| style="text-align:center;" colspan="2"| Career
| 24 || 1 || 8.5 || .357 || .303 || .286 || 1.3 || .3 || .1 || .1 || 2.2

Playoffs

|-
| style="text-align:left;"| 2022
| style="text-align:left;"| Miami
| 8 || 0 || 3.9 || .429 || .600 || — || .6 || .4 || .0 || .0 || 1.1
|- class="sortbottom"
| style="text-align:center;" colspan="2"| Career
| 8 || 0 || 3.9 || .429 || .600 || — || .6 || .4 || .0 || .0 || 1.1

References

External links

Wheeling Cardinals bio

1996 births
Living people
American expatriate basketball people in Germany
American men's basketball players
Basketball players from Baltimore
Crailsheim Merlins players
Delaware Blue Coats players
Miami Heat players
Philadelphia 76ers players
Small forwards
Undrafted National Basketball Association players
United States men's national basketball team players
Wheeling Cardinals men's basketball players